Dwarf elephants are prehistoric members of the order Proboscidea which, through the process of allopatric speciation on islands, evolved much smaller body sizes (around ) in comparison with their immediate ancestors. Dwarf elephants are an example of insular dwarfism, the phenomenon whereby large terrestrial vertebrates (usually mammals) that colonize islands evolve dwarf forms, a phenomenon attributed to adaptation to resource-poor environments and selection for early maturation and reproduction. Some modern populations of Asian elephants have also undergone size reduction on islands to a lesser degree, resulting in populations of pygmy elephants.

Fossil remains of dwarf elephants have been found on the Mediterranean islands of Cyprus, Malta (at Għar Dalam), Crete (in Chania  at Vamos, Stylos and in a now-underwater cave on the coast), Sicily, Sardinia, the Cyclades Islands and the Dodecanese Islands, which are mostly members of the genus Palaeoloxodon, descending from the large 4 m tall mainland European species Palaeoloxodon antiquus. Dwarf species of Stegodon have been found on the islands of Indonesia and the Philippines. The Channel Islands of California once supported a dwarf species descended from Columbian mammoths, while populations of small woolly mammoths were once found on Saint Paul Island;  the mammoths that existed on Wrangel Island are no longer considered dwarfs.

The Mediterranean islands

Dwarf elephants first inhabited the Mediterranean islands during the Pleistocene, including all the major islands with the apparent exception of Corsica and the Balearics. Mediterranean dwarf elephants have generally been considered as members of the genus Palaeoloxodon, derived from the continental straight-tusked elephant, Palaeoloxodon antiquus (Falconer & Cautley, 1847), Syn.: Elephas antiquus. An exception is the dwarf Middle-Late Pleistocene Sardinian mammoth, Mammuthus lamarmorai (Major, 1883), the first endemic elephant of the Mediterranean islands recognized as belonging to the mammoth line. Mammuthus creticus from the Early Pleistocene of Crete, formerly considered a member of Palaeoloxodon, is now also considered to be a mammoth, and approaches the size of the smallest dwarf elephants.

During low sea levels, the Mediterranean islands were colonised again and again, giving rise, sometimes on the same island, to several species (or subspecies) of different body sizes. As the Ice Age came to an end, sea levels rose, stranding elephants on the island. The island of Sicily appears to have been colonised by proboscideans in at least three separate waves of colonisation. These endemic dwarf elephants were taxonomically different on each island or group of very close islands, like the Cyclades archipelago.

There are many uncertainties about the time of colonisation, the phylogenetic relationships and the taxonomic status of dwarf elephants on the Mediterranean islands. Extinction of the insular dwarf elephants has not been correlated with the arrival of humans to the islands. Furthermore, it has been suggested by the palaeontologist Othenio Abel in 1914, that the finding of skeletons of such elephants sparked the idea that they belonged to giant one-eyed monsters, because the center nasal opening was thought to be the socket of a single eye, and thus perhaps were, for example, the origin of the one-eyed Cyclopes of Greek mythology.

Italy and Malta

Greece

Crete

Poulakakis and others proposed in 2002 to rename all the described specimens of larger size than Mammuthus creticus under the new subspecies name Elephas antiquus creutzburgi (Kuss, 1965).  After DNA research, published in 2006, it has been proposed to rename Elephas (Palaeoloxodon) creticus into Mammuthus creticus (Bate, 1907). In a recent study of 2007, it was argued for the groundlessness of the theory by Poulakakis et al. in 2006, showing the weak points of that DNA research. However, morphological data is at least equivocal, and may also support placement in Mammuthus.

Cyclades

Remains of paleoloxodontine elephants have been reported from several Cyclades islands. The Delos elephant's size is comparable to Palaeoloxodon mnaidriensis. The Naxos elephant has been described as Palaeoloxodon lomolinoi and it was smaller than the Delos elephant with a calculated body mass of only 10 % of that of its mainland ancestor Palaeoloxodon antiquus.

Dodecanese

On the island of Rhodes, bones of an endemic dwarf elephant have been discovered. This elephant was similar in size to Palaeoloxodon mnaidriensis.

Two groups of remains of dwarf elephants have been found on the island of Tilos. They are similar in size to Palaeoloxodon mnaidriensis and the smaller Palaeoloxodon falconeri, but the two groups indicate sexual dimorphism. The remains had originally been designated to Palaeoloxodon antiquus falconeri (Busk, 1867). However, this name refers to the dwarf elephants from the island of Malta. As a result, since no migration route between the two islands can be proved, this name should not be used when referring to the elephant remnants from Tilos. The species has been described as Elephas tiliensis in 2007 and it is now assigned to genus Palaeoloxodon.

The Tilos dwarf elephant is the first dwarf elephant whose DNA sequence has been studied. The results of this research are consistent with previous morphological reports, according to which Palaeoloxodon is more closely related to Elephas than to Loxodonta or Mammuthus. On the other hand DNA analysis in 2017 conclude that the closest living relative oft the genus Palaeoloxodon is the African forest elephant (Loxodonta cyclotis). The paper suggests that the current view of elephant evolution is "in need of substantial revision". After the study of new osteological material that has been excavated in anatomical connection in the Charkadio Cave on Tilos island the new species name Palaeoloxodon tiliensis has been assigned to the Tilos dwarf elephants. It was the latest paleoloxodontine to survive in Europe. They did not become extinct until around 4000 BC, so this elephant survived well into the Holocene. An exhibition is available at the Municipality of Tilos Island, soon to be transferred to the new building near Charkadio Cave.

Cyprus

The Cyprus dwarf elephant survived at least until 11,000 BC. Its estimated body weight was only , only 2% of its  ancestor. Molars of this dwarf elephant are reduced to approximately 40% the size of mainland straight-tusked elephants.

Remains of the species were first discovered and recorded by Dorothea Bate in a cave in the Kyrenia hills of Cyprus in 1902 and reported in 1903.

The Channel Islands of California
The Columbian mammoth (Mammuthus columbi) produced a separate, isolated population at the end of the Pleistocene on the Channel Islands of California, most likely about 40,000 years ago (although the time of isolation is not fully known). Selective forces on the Channel Islands resulted in smaller animals, forming a new species, the pygmy mammoth (Mammuthus exilis).

St. Paul Island and Wrangel Island
Mammoths also survived longer on Saint Paul Island in the Bering Sea until 6000 BC.
Survival of a mammoth population may be explained by local geographic, topographic and climatic features, which entailed preservation of communities of steppe plants, as well as a degree of isolation sufficient to delay colonization by humans. St. Paul Island shares this characteristic of geographic isolation, implying that human hunting may have played a role in the disappearance of the woolly mammoth.

During the last ice age, woolly mammoths (Mammuthus primigenius) lived on Wrangel Island in the Arctic Ocean and survived until 1700 BC, the most recent survival of any known mammoth population. Wrangel Island is thought to have become separated from the mainland by 12000 BC. However this classification has been re-evaluated and since the Second International Mammoth Conference in 1999, these mammoths are no longer considered to be true "dwarf mammoths".

Indonesia
On Sulawesi and Flores, evidence of a succession of distinct endemic island faunas has been found, including dwarfed elephants, dating until the Middle Pleistocene. Around the Early Middle Pleistocene, these dwarfed elephants were replaced by new immigrants of larger to intermediate sizes.

Flores
Stegodon florensis became extinct about 50,000 years ago, around the time of the arrival of modern humans.

Sulawesi
The dwarfed Stegodon sompoensis lived during the Pleistocene on the island of Sulawesi. They had a shoulder height of only 1.5 m.

Central Java
In 2014 a dwarf elephant was found in the Semedo area, Tegal, Central Java, so it was named Stegodon semedoensis.

See also

 Borneo elephant

References

Prehistoric elephants
Holocene extinctions
History of Sardinia
History of Sicily
Maltese prehistory
Prehistoric Crete
Prehistoric Cyprus
Cyclades
Dodecanese

pt:Elefante-pigmeu